Who Put That Hair in My Toothbrush? is a 1984 young adult novel written by Jerry Spinelli.

Plot summary

The story starts by having chapters between a girl named Megin and her brother Greg, who are in the 7th and 9th grade, respectively. The book follows their various arguments and misadventures while exploring the thorny issue of sibling rivalry, giving both sibling's very own perspective on their disagreements and thoughts.
For Greg, the story follows his love life, and how he struggles between the choice of two girls, while Megin's story mainly follows her new relationship with Emile and Zoe, which are two of Megin's new friends.

Trivia
The characters Megin and Greg are based on Spinelli's real life children Molly and Jeffery.
 Leo Borlock, who would later be the narrator in Stargirl is mentioned  in this novel as a person who everyone goes to for advice.
There are three main book covers for this book.

Footnotes

External links
Spinelli' site on the book

1984 American novels
American children's novels
American young adult novels
Novels by Jerry Spinelli
Little, Brown and Company books
1984 children's books